The 1937 Miami Redskins football team was an American football team that represented Miami University as a member of the Buckeye Athletic Association (BAA) during the 1937 college football season. In their sixth season under head coach Frank Wilton, the Redskins compiled a 4–4–1 record (2–3 against conference opponents) and finished fourth out of six teams in the BAA.

Schedule

References

Miami
Miami RedHawks football seasons
Miami Redskins football